Vigaña is one of 15 parishes in Belmonte de Miranda, a municipality within the province and autonomous community of Asturias, in northern Spain.

Parishes in Belmonte de Miranda